Guru Deshpande is an Indian film director, producer and distributor, known for his work in Kannada film industry. He is well known for the Blockbuster Hit Raja Huli starring Rocking Star Yash and Meghana Raj. In 2019, Guru Deshpande turned produced launching his banner G Cinemas and started a Film Institute under the name G Academy in Bengaluru.

Early life

Guru Deshpande was born at Ilakkal Government Hospital, Bagalkot District (formerly in Bijapur District). His father's name is Marthandarao Deshpande and mother's name is Vijayalakshmi. His hometown is Nagore near Talikote in Bijapur district. Guru Deshpande did primary school from UKG to 7th grade at Balabharathi School and studied higher grades at SK High school at Talikote. He came to Bangalore in 1996 and graduated Diploma in Mechanical at Acharya Polytechnic College.

Career

Guru Deshpande entered film industry with a simple dream to become a director in 1999-2000. He joined Karnataka Film Training Centre at Wilson Garden and took three months training in direction department. His first project as assistant director was Kumar Govind and Sudharani starrer 'Chandana Chiguru' directed by Abdul Rehman Pasha.

In the same project he also worked as assistant for art director G Murthy. Guru Deshpande later worked as an assistant art director for several films with G. Murthy. He continued learning experience as assistant director in several films including 'Sainika', ‘Sarvabhouma’ and 'Siddhu'.

Guru Deshpande married Shilpa Deshpande in 2004 and they have a son. Shilpa will be debuting in films with ‘Pentagon’ under the screen name Pritika Deshpande. In 2007, Guru Deshpande announced director movie Varasdhara starring Ravi Belagere in the lead role. Two new actors Ashwini and Sandeep were introduced and movie released on 7 March 2008. Post that he handled distribution of films from 2009 to 2011 including Endhiran, Adukulam, Velayudham, Sanju and Geeta, Meera Weds Murali, Kirataka and many more.

Breakthrough

In 2012, Guru Deshpande moved back to direction with Yash, Meghana Raj starrer Raja Huli and was produced by K Manju. The movie released on Kannada Rajyotsava in 2013 and got a fantastic opening at the box-office. Despite facing competition from a major Bollywood release Krrish 3 the Yash starrer stormed the Karnataka box-office. According to trade reports, collections of Raja Huli was better than Krrish 3 and Tamil flick Arrambam at Bangalore box-office.

The film did excellent business on weekdays and collected approximately ₹5 crore Nett in the first week. Raja Huli was big budget film costing ₹6 crore, it recovered production cost within a week. Raja Huli went on to complete 119 days of successful run and was declared Blockbuster. Raja Huli completed Yash's hat-trick success after Drama and Googly.

In 2014, Guru Deshpande announced Rudratandava starring Chiranjeevi Sarja and Radhika Kumaraswamy,the action film released in February 2015 to mixed response. His next project was the 2016 comedy drama John Jani Janardhan with Ajay Rao, Yogesh and 'Madarangi' Krishna in lead roles.
 
In 2018, Guru Deshpande partnered with Chiranjeevi Sarja again for Samhaara, the romantic action thriller film had Haripriya and Kavya Shetty essay female lead roles. In 2019 launched producer K. Manju son Shreyas Manju with Padde Huli, the action drama had Nishvika Naidu as female lead and host of Sandalwood Superstars playing key roles.

Production House and Film School

After working for two decades in Kannada Film Industry, director Guru Deshpande turned producer launching G Cinemas in 2019 and announced Gentleman starring Prajwal Devaraj and Gandhinagar was excited with this amazing combination. Gentleman is a crime-action film written and directed by Jadesh Kumar Hampi, Action Prince Prajwal Devaraj and Nishvika Naidu essayed the lead roles, B. Ajaneesh Loknath handled background score. Puneeth Rajkumar and Dhruva Sarja released trailer on 6 January 2020 and it immediately caught audience attention.

The film's Wake Up Theme song sung by Anthony Dasan was released on 29 January 2020. Even before Gentleman movie released there was big demand in Tamil and Telugu for the remake rights. 
 The film was released on 7 February 2020 to a good response.

In 2020, Guru Deshpande launched two more movies under G Cinemas banner 'Love You Racchu' starring Ajay Rao and Rachita Ram written by Shashank and directed by debutant Shankar Raj and 'Pentagon', an anthology film. 'Pentagon' has generated curiosity among Sandalwood fans especially for the combination of five well-known directors Raghu Shivamoga, Chandra Mohan, Akash Srivatsa, Kiran Kumar and Guru Deshpande. Manikanth Kadri will be composing the music, cinematography is handled by Kiran Hampapur and Abhilash Kallathi, and edited by Venkatesh UDV.
His next project will be the much awaited sports drama ‘Thackeray’ expected to go on floors soon.

After donning the hats of director and producer Guru Deshpande launched G Academy, Institute of Cinema and Entertainment in 2019. Well known Sandalwood directors Dayal Padmanabhan, 'Jatta' Giriraj, Satyaprakash, 'Bahaddur' Chethan Kumar are among faculty at the film school.

Filmography

Director & Screenplay

Producer

Actor

References

External links 

 

Living people
21st-century Indian film directors
Kannada film directors
Male actors in Kannada cinema
20th-century Indian male actors
21st-century Indian male actors
Male actors from Bangalore
Film directors from Bangalore
Kannada screenwriters
Indian male film actors
Screenwriters from Bangalore
1980 births